Robert G. Flanders Jr. (born 9 July 1949), also known as Bob Flanders, is an American attorney who is a partner at Whelan Corrente & Flanders. He is also the founder of Flanders and Medeiros.

Previously, Flanders served as an Associate Justice of the Rhode Island Supreme Court from 1996 to 2004.

Early life and education
Flanders was born in 1949 in North Massapequa, Long Island, New York and grew up in a middle-class family. His father was a salesman while his mother worked in fast food restaurants. He received his early education from Chaminade High School in Mineola, New York.

For his college education, he went to Brown University and graduated magna cum laude in 1971 with a major in English. During his college years at Brown, he was elected to Phi Beta Kappa and received a prize for an essay he wrote on the classicism of Henry Fielding in Tom Jones.

As a law student at Harvard, Flanders played minor league baseball for the Detroit Tigers and served as an editor of the Harvard Law Record. He graduated from law school in 1974.

Career
Flanders started his legal career in New York by joining Paul, Weiss, Rifkind, Wharton & Garrison as a litigation associate.

In 1975, he returned to Rhode Island and joined Edwards & Angell, where he became a partner and chairman of litigation department. He also served as assistant executive counsel to the Governor of Rhode Island.

In 1987, he founded a business and government litigation firm, Flanders and Medeiros.

In 2004, after eight years of service as a justice of the Rhode Island Supreme Court, he resigned from the post and joined Hinckley, Allen & Snyder as a partner.

As an academic, Flanders has taught constitutional law and judicial process courses at the Roger Williams University Law School, as a distinguished visiting professor, and at Brown University, as an adjunct assistant professor of law and public policy.

Flanders serves as a member of various boards of directors and commissions, including the Care New England Hospital System, Women & Infants Hospital (vice chair of the board), the Providence Performing Arts Center, the Veterans Memorial Auditorium, the Rhode Island Historical Society, Common Cause of Rhode Island, the Brown University Leadership Advisory Council, and the Greater Providence YMCA, where he served as chairman of the Board for a three-year term that ended on May 29, 2003.

Community outreach
Flanders was elected twice to the Town Council of Barrington and served for two terms. He has also served as a town solicitor for Glocester, Rhode Island and as a general counsel of the Rhode Island Solid Waste Management Corporation.

In 1996, he was selected as one of five finalists by a judicial merit-selection commission. Later, Governor Lincoln Almond named him to a vacant seat on the five member Rhode Island Supreme Court. Before joining the Supreme Court, he was a special prosecutor for the Judicial Tenure and Discipline Commission. On March 29, 1996, Flanders was sworn in and became one of the five serving justices of the Rhode Island Supreme Court.

In 2007, after resigning from the Supreme Court and returning to private law practice, the Governor of Rhode Island appointed him to chair the State Board of Regents for Secondary and Elementary Education.

In 2011, the State w
appointed him as the Receiver for the financially troubled City of Central Falls, Rhode Island. After the  City filed for bankruptcy, he led the municipal restructuring of the City’s finances.  As a result, he provided the City with a 5-year consensual recovery plan that eliminated a $6 million annual operating deficit. 

In 2018, the Rhode Island Republican Party endorsed and nominated him as their candidate for election to the United States Senate.  Although he eventually lost the election to the incumbent Democrat, Sheldon Whitehouse, he was the highest statewide vote getter of all the Republican candidates during that election cycle.

2018 U.S. Senate campaign

Flanders won the Republican party nomination, defeating the only other candidate on the ballot, Rocky De La Fuente, a businessman who was seeking to get on the Senate ballot in several states in 2018.

As the Republican Party nominee, he participated in the 2018 election for US Senator from Rhode Island. He lost the election to Democratic incumbent, Sheldon Whitehouse.

Personal life
Flanders grew up in a middle class household and is the oldest of seven children. He is a strong advocate of separation of powers.

He and his wife Ann live in East Greenwich, Rhode Island. They have three children.

Bibliography
 Flanders, Jr., Robert G. (2005). Rhode Island Evidence Manual. LexisNexis. 
 Flanders, Jr., Robert G.; Conley, Patrick (2007). The Rhode Island Constitution: A Reference Guide. Praeger.
 Flanders, Jr., Robert G.; Michaelis, Ron C.; Wulff, Paula H. (2008). A Litigator's Guide to DNA: From the Laboratory to the Courtroom. Academic Press.
 Flanders, Jr., Robert G. et al. (2017). A Practical Guide to Land Use Law in Rhode Island
 Flanders, Jr., Robert G. et al. (2022). Rhode Island Civil and Appellate Procedure with Commentaries. Thomson/Reuters.

References

External links
Flanders Senate campaign website

Living people
1949 births
20th-century American lawyers
Candidates in the 2018 United States Senate elections
Brown University alumni
Chaminade High School alumni
Harvard Law School alumni
People from East Greenwich, Rhode Island
People from Nassau County, New York
Rhode Island lawyers
Rhode Island Republicans
Justices of the Rhode Island Supreme Court